Jeffrey Scott Wilner (December 31, 1971) is a former tight end in the National Football League (NFL).

Biography
Wilner was born on December 31, 1971, in East Meadowbrook, New York.

He graduated from Phillips Exeter Academy and played college football at Wesleyan University where he was teammates with future NFL coach Eric Mangini.  Wilner was the first graduate of the university to play in the NFL.

College career
In 1990, as a freshman, Wilner recorded four receptions for 27 yards and one touchdown while playing tight end for coach Kevin Spencer.

After spending his sophomore year playing offensive tackle, Wilner returned to tight end for his junior season, recording 12 receptions for 163 yards and one touchdown.

As a senior, Wilner recorded 28 receptions for 245 yards and three touchdowns at tight end.  Additionally, he recorded three blocked PAT attempts and one blocked punt, which he returned 50 yards for a touchdown.

Professional career
Wilner was signed as an undrafted free agent by the Green Bay Packers in 1994.  As a rookie, Wilner played in 11 games and started one.  Filling in for injured starter Mark Chmura, he finished the season with five receptions for 31 yards and no touchdowns.

Wilner began his sophomore campaign with the Packers, but was subsequently traded to the Denver Broncos.  While in Denver, he did not see any playing time during a regular season game.  After being released by the Broncos, he was later drafted by the Barcelona Dragons of the World League of American Football (WLAF), but was unable to play due to injury.

See also
 List of Green Bay Packers players

References

1971 births
Living people
American football tight ends
Denver Broncos players
Green Bay Packers players
Wesleyan Cardinals football players
Phillips Exeter Academy alumni
Players of American football from New York (state)